Oreophrynella vasquezi is a species of toad in the family Bufonidae.
It is found in Venezuela and possibly Guyana.

Its natural habitat is subtropical or tropical moist montane forests. It is known from a single location, Ilú-tepui.

References

Oreophrynella
Amphibians described in 1994
Taxonomy articles created by Polbot
Amphibians of the Tepuis